The 2012 FIA WTCC Race of Hungary was the fifth round of the 2012 World Touring Car Championship season and the second running of the FIA WTCC Race of Hungary. It was held on 6 May 2012 at the Hungaroring in Mogyoród near Budapest, Hungary. The first race was won by Yvan Muller for Chevrolet and the second race was won by Norbert Michelisz for Zengő Motorsport.

Background
Yvan Muller arrived in Hungary leading the championship from both of his Chevrolet team mates, 27 points ahead of Rob Huff with Alain Menu a further point behind. Pepe Oriola was leading the Yokohama Independents' Trophy.

Isaac Tutumlu left Proteam Racing after the Race of Slovakia, reducing the team to one car for Mehdi Bennani. James Thompson also rejoined the series, driving a Lada Granta WTCC for TMS Sport in the first of two outings in 2012.

Report

Free Practice
Yvan Muller set the pace in the first free practice session ahead of Lukoil Racing Team's Gabriele Tarquini and Chevrolet's Alain Menu. Local driver Norbert Michelisz was the quickest independent driver. Three drives were warned for exceeding track limits, with Mehdi Bennani also being issued with a black and white flag warning.

Tarquini went fastest in free practice two, heading the Chevrolets of Muller and Huff and the SEAT of Darryl O'Young. Thompson ended the session ninth in the Lada Granta. Once again, drivers were warned for exceeding track limits, with Tarquini losing one of his times as a consequence.

Qualifying
The Chevrolets started 1–2–3 in the first race with Muller on pole position for the second time in 2012. Franz Engstler started on pole position for the reversed grid second race. Menu lost time behind Engstler in Q2 and started third for the first race. The ROAL Motorsport drivers were sent to the back of the grid for a parc fermé infringement, Alberto Cerqui had qualified 13th and Tom Coronel had qualified 19th before the penalty.

Warm-Up
Tarquini led the morning warm-up session ahead of the Chevrolet trio of Huff, Menu and Muller.

Race One
Muller led away from the rolling start but an incident behind caused Michelisz to run wide and the chain reaction as several cars recovered forced Tarquini and Tom Boardman into retirement. Bennani had got up to second by the first corner before dropping down to fourth by the second corner, after which the Chevrolets led 1–2–3. Michelisz had recovered to sixth place but was overtaken by Coronel on the final lap, the ROAL driver having climbed from 21st on the grid. Muller took the win ahead of Huff, Menu and Bennani who took his best ever WTCC result and the Yokohama Independents' Trophy win.

Race Two
Engstler started from pole position for the reversed grid race, however a fast start from Michelisz in fifth ensured he led into the first corner. The order behind Michelisz was Oriola ahead of Bennani until Menu came charging through the field from eighth on the grid to take second. Huff finished seventh and Muller finished tenth after a last lap off put him behind Stefano D'Aste and Engstler. Michelisz took the overall win and the Independents' win in front of his home fans.

Results

Qualifying

Bold denotes Pole position for second race.

 — The ROAL Motorsport drivers had their times from qualifying removed after the team broke a parc fermé regulation.

Race 1

Bold denotes Fastest lap.

Race 2

Bold denotes Fastest lap.

Standings after the round

Drivers' Championship standings

Yokohama Independents' Trophy standings

Manufacturers' Championship standings

 Note: Only the top five positions are included for both sets of drivers' standings.

References

External links 

Hungary
Race of Hungary
FIA WTCC Race of Hungary